Farnoosh Samadi (Persian: فرنوش صمدی; December 23) is an Iranian director and screenwriter. her short film The Silence (2016) was nominated for a Short Film Palme d'Or at the 2016 Cannes Film Festival.

Career 

Farnoosh Samadi was born in Iran. She graduated from the Fine Arts Academy in Rome. She directed the short films "The Silence" (2016), "Gaze" (2017), and "The Role" (2018). "180° Rule" (2020) is her first feature. "The Silence" her first short film co-directed by Ali Asgari, had its world premiere in competition at the 2016 Cannes Film Festival. Her second short film, "Gaze"  had its world premiere at the 2017 Locarno Film Festival and won the Grand Jury award for Live Action Short Film at 2017 AFI Film Festival, also it won the Golden Pram Award at Zagreb Film Festival in 2018. she has screenplayed "Disappearance" a debut feature by Iranian director Ali Asgari which premiered at 74th Venice International Film Festival and at the 2017 Toronto International Film Festival and won the award for best film at the 28th Singapore International Film Festival in 2017. her debut film 180° Rule (2020) premiered at the 2020 Toronto International Film Festival, and received an award at 65th Valladolid International Film Festival for the Best Film of Meeting Point section also received two Crystal Simorgh award nominations for the "Best Sound Effects" for Amir Hossein Ghasemi and "Best Supporting Actress" for Azita Hajian at the 39th Fajr International Film Festival.

Filmography

Feature film

Short film

Awards and nominations

References

External links 

 

Living people
Iranian women film directors
Iranian screenwriters
Date of birth missing (living people)
Year of birth missing (living people)